HMS Ceres was a C-class light cruiser of the Royal Navy.  She was the name ship of the Ceres group of the C-class of cruisers.

Construction and early years

The Ceres was constructed at Clydebank by John Brown & Company.  She was laid down on 26 April 1916, launched on 24 March 1917 , and commissioned into the navy on 1 June 1917.

In July 1917 Ceres joined the 6th Light Cruiser Squadron as part of the Grand Fleet. She was transferred to the 3rd Light Cruiser Squadron in 1919 which was assigned to operate in the Mediterranean. During 1920 was operating in the Black Sea in support of operations against Communist forces. On 30 March 1923 whilst in port at Constantinople, USS Fox collided with her stern causing damage to both ships. In 1927 Ceres returned to the UK for deployment with the Home Fleet. During 1929-1931 she was refitted and placed in reserve, but reactivated in 1932 to join the Mediterranean Fleet. In November Ceres was again reduced to the reserve.

Wartime career

The Home and Mediterranean Fleets
On the outbreak of war in 1939 Ceres was recommissioned from the Reserve Fleet and placed on the Northern Patrol in the Denmark Strait between Iceland and Greenland. In January 1940, Ceres underwent a refit at the yards of Harland & Wolff in Belfast, Northern Ireland in preparation for her reassignment to the Mediterranean. On 15 February she was reassigned from HMNB Devonport to her new base at Malta, travelling via Gibraltar. During March she led contraband patrols in the Ionian Sea, and off the coast of Greece, checking ships transporting cargoes to the Axis countries, as well as escorting Allied convoys.

The Eastern Fleet and Indian Ocean
During April and May 1940, Ceres was assigned to the Eastern Fleet and based at Singapore. She was used to patrol off the Dutch East Indies coast in opposition to Japanese naval forces. In June she was assigned to operate in the Indian Ocean and based at Colombo and later Bombay, where she escorted tanker convoys from the Persian Gulf to the British colony at Aden. She then spent several months off the east coast of Africa, based at Mombassa, Kenya. Whilst on patrol off the coast of Somaliland she evacuated troops and civilians from British Somaliland to Aden, and she was later involved in convoy duties sailing around Cape Horn between Durban and Cape Town. Later that year she was sent to the Seychelles and other islands to search for German commerce raiders, who were preying on Allied shipping in the area.

From 16–19 August 1940 Ceres assisted in the evacuation of British and Allied soldiers from Berbera in British Somaliland as Italian forces moved on the capital, transporting them to the relative safety of Aden. In this capacity, Ceres bombarded the advancing Italian column on 17 August, slowing their progress and giving British troops retreating after the Battle of Tug Argan time to evacuate.

In February 1941 Ceres, in company with the cruisers HMS Hawkins and HMS Capetown and the destroyer HMS Kandahar, blockaded Kisimayu in support of the offensive against Italian Somaliland, and the eventual reconquest of British Somaliland in March that year.  She also rescued merchant navy prisoners of war from Brava and transported them to Mombassa. After this Ceres again returned to Colombo for repairs.

On New Year's Day 1942, in company with the sloop HMS Bridgewater she escorted the 18 ships of Convoy WS-14 to South Africa from the U.K. with reinforcements for the Middle East. Ceres spent two months in the Persian Gulf, and then arrived at Simonstown for a three-month refit, where she was dry-docked. As with most of the ships of the 'C'-class, she was also fitted with six 20 mm single AA weapons to become an anti-aircraft cruiser. Coventry, Curacoa and Curlew had already undergone conversion before the war, but the outbreak delayed Ceres''' and Cardiff's conversions.  She was then based at Aden and she also participated in the fall of Djibouti to the allied forces. She spent the rest of the year escorting convoys to Durban.  She finally returned to home waters and her homeport of Devonport in October 1943.  By now she had steamed over 235,000 miles in her career.

Home waters
In 1943 and 1944, HMS Ceres was used by the Royal Navy as "station ship" based at the Royal Naval College in Dartmouth.  In late April 1944, HMS Ceres was refitted with radar and anti-aircraft weaponry and assigned to the US Task Force 127 to carry the Flag of the United States Navy Service Force during the invasion of Normandy. Ceres was assigned as one of the two Shuttle Control ships at Omaha Beach and, anchored inshore, directed the assembly and departure of unloaded, outbound vessels and convoys. Shuttle Control Command, embarked in  anchored offshore, directed both Ceres for outbound vessels and the inbound Shuttle Control exercised from Capetown.

Subsequently, following the destruction of the artificial harbour off Omaha Beach during the Great Storm that occurred approximately two weeks after 6 June 1944 and as a result of the German demolition of the Port of Cherbourg in late June, HMS Ceres and her sister ship, HMS Capetown, was assigned to the task of Shuttle Control, expediting the passage and unloading of vessels from the UK to Omaha and Utah Beaches.  HMS Ceres remained "On Station" off Omaha Beach for the entire summer of 1944 from the early hours of 7 June until the end of August, 1944.  When Cherbourg became available to shipping from the UK, HMS Ceres returned to Plymouth for overhaul and those US naval officers who had staffed the "Shuttle Control Operation" were reassigned.  After the end of the war, and by now obsolete, she was again placed in reserve and used as an accommodation/base ship at Portsmouth.  She spent less than a year in this new role however.  Ceres'' was sold and broken up for scrap at Bolckow, Blyth in July 1946, after 29 years in service.

References

Bibliography
 
 
 
 
 
 
  published in

External links
 HMS Ceres at Uboat.net
 The National Archives (UK)

 

C-class cruisers
Ships built on the River Clyde
1917 ships
World War I cruisers of the United Kingdom
World War II cruisers of the United Kingdom